Early parliamentary elections were held in Nauru on 8 February 1997, following a series of no-confidence votes in the Presidency,. which had changed hands three times since the 1995 elections. All candidates ran as independents. Following the elections, Kinza Clodumar was elected President by the Parliament, which included four new members. Voter turnout was 91.8%.

The only female member in the previous Parliament, Ruby Dediya (MP for Anetan/Ewa), lost her seat, meaning the resulting Parliament was composed exclusively of men. There were to be no more women MPs until 2013.

Results

References

Nauru
1997 in Nauru
Elections in Nauru
Non-partisan elections
Election and referendum articles with incomplete results